John Richard Rolfe (1935 – 12 August 2020) was a British actor. He was named after the colonist who married Pocahontas in Jamestown, Virginia.

His stage work includes appearances at the Bristol Old Vic and with the RSC. His television credits include: Z-Cars, Dixon of Dock Green, Adam Adamant Lives!, The First Lady, Softly, Softly, Doctor Who (in the serials The War Machines, The Moonbase and The Green Death), Paul Temple, The Troubleshooters, Out of the Unknown, The Regiment, Spy Trap, Warship, Oil Strike North, Survivors, Blake's 7, Minder, Secret Army, The Enigma Files, Yes Minister, One by One, Howards' Way and The House of Eliott. He did the first, moustached and spectacled postman in "Mr. Bean Rides Again" (he played the postman seen before Mr. Bean got locked in the letterbox after he stole a lady's stamp for his own letter). He also played Graham in the 1980 film McVicar, starring Roger Daltrey. In 1994 he guest starred in The Bill.

Filmography

Film

Television

References

External links
 

1935 births
2020 deaths
British male stage actors
British male television actors